Kim Clijsters and Jelena Dokic were the defending champions, but both players decided to focus on the singles tournament only.

Wildcards Mary Pierce and Rennae Stubbs won the title by defeating Elena Bovina and Els Callens 6–3, 6–3 in the final.

Seeds

Draw

Draw

References

External links
 Official results archive (ITF)
 Official results archive (WTA)

2003 WTA Tour
LA Women's Tennis Championships